Charles Vane was an English pirate.

Charles Vane may also refer to:

Charles Vane, 3rd Marquess of Londonderry (1778–1854)
Charles Vane (actor) (1860–1943), British stage and film actor

See also
Charles Vane-Tempest-Stewart (disambiguation)